{{Infobox NGO
| name                = Women's Health and Equal Rights (WHER) Initiative
| logo                = Women's_Health_and_Equal_Rights_Initiative_WHER.png
| founded             = 2011
| type                = NGO, Nonprofit
| location            = Abuja, Nigeria
| products            = Advocacy
Empowerment
Health & Well-being
Research & Documentation
Lesbiblioteque – E-library (Books)
| key_people          = Akudo Oguaghamba''
| homepage            = 
}}Women's Health and Equal Rights Initiative (WHER''') is a Nigerian feminist, LBSMW led and non-profit organization, focus on promoting an extensive conceptual knowledge of sexuality and sexual orientation, providing a platform for the promotion of the wellbeing and protection of the rights of LBSMW and providing access to health and other support services to LBQ women through advocacy, education, empowerment, and psychosocial support.

Women's Health and Equal Rights (WHER)Initiative is the first LBSMW organization in Nigeria founded in 2011 in Abuja by Akudo Oguaghamba. As a partner in the Solidarity Alliance for Human Rights and other membership-based alliance of individuals and organizations working on protecting and promoting the human rights of sexual and gender minorities, WHER is actively engaged with advocacy for the advancement and realization of human rights and equal access to opportunities for marginalized women in Nigeria. They have implemented series of mental health and human rights training, financial empowerment workshops, consciousness-raising, community edutainment activities. Which includes their innovative Sister2Sister initiative aimed at training and building leaders across the country to provide counseling, peer support and coordinate local community networks in their respective cities.

References

External links 

 

Non-profit organizations based in Africa
Non-profit organizations based in Nigeria